Marie-Laure Giraudon (born 27 August 1972) is a French former freestyle swimmer who competed in the 1992 Summer Olympics.

References

1972 births
Living people
French female freestyle swimmers
Olympic swimmers of France
Swimmers at the 1992 Summer Olympics